Queen Elizabeth's School is an academy school, with a sixth-form, in Crediton, Devon. It has 1300 students. It was formed as a comprehensive school in the early 1970s by a merger of The Shelley Secondary Modern with the Queen Elizabeth's Grammar School.

History

The grammar school was founded in 1547 and started teaching in 1572 with 10 pupils. The grammar school moved to new buildings in 1861, and merged with the girls' high school in 1966.

The college's coat of arms shows the figure of Saint Boniface, the patron saint of the town.

The school gained academy status on 1 April 2011.

The school previously had state boarding provision, but this was closed in 2019.

Ofsted inspection judgements

In the 2015 Ofsted inspection of the school, it was rated as "Good". As of 2021, the school's most recent inspection was in 2018, with a judgement of Requires Improvement.

Performing arts

Each year a play or musical is put on by the drama and music departments. The QE Jazz Band regularly performs locally and tours abroad.

Buildings

A new humanities block composed primarily of permanent classroom "blocks" (lowered onto each other by crane) was opened in 2010 to replace the old Quad courts. In 2011 the upper site technology blocks, hosting food technology, textiles, graphic products and product design, were refurbished.

Notable alumni

Sam Hill (born 1993), rugby player
Marcus Street, rugby player
Harry Treadaway (born 1984), actor
Luke Treadaway (born 1984), actor
Fred Vahrman (born 1990), musician
Sam Way (born 1988), model
Jack Yeandle (born 1989), rugby player

References

External links
 Official School Website
 Website of school based band "Alternative Plan" 
 QECC boarding at Ofsted
 inspection reports at ofsted
 Aerial shot of Lower school

Academies in Devon
Secondary schools in Devon
Crediton